Paradise Lost In Cyberspace was a BBC Radio 4 pseudo-science fiction comedy series of 6 episodes in 1998.

Cast

 Stephen Moore as George
 Patsy Byrne as Doris
 Geoffrey McGivern as O'Connoll

Crew
 written by Colin Swash

Episodes and broadcast dates

References

External links
 The Official BBC web site

BBC Radio 4 programmes